Gurganus is a surname. Notable people with the surname include:

Allan Gurganus (born 1947), American writer
Charles M. Gurganus, United States Marine Corps flag officer